"I Like You So Much Better When You're Naked" (sometimes shortened to "I Like You So Much Better" or "Naked"), is a 2008 song by Norwegian rock musician Ida Maria. Ten months after the UK release of the single, it was released in the US on May 26, 2009. The song borrows from The Banana Splits Adventure Hour's opening theme, "The Tra La La Song", and pays homage to them in its music video.

Track listings

CD single
"I Like You So Much Better When You're Naked" (album version)
"Leave Me Let Me Go"

7" vinyl
"I Like You So Much Better When You're Naked"
"Lightning"

Chart performance
On 27 July 2008 the song entered the UK Singles Chart at #18 on downloads alone and peaked at #13. On 14 August 2008 the song entered the Irish Singles Chart at #34. With the release of Fortress Round My Heart in the United States, the song first appeared on the Hot Modern Rock Tracks chart in April 2009.

The song was also featured on Triple J's Hottest 100 of 2008 in Australia.

Charts

References

External links
 Song review
 Acoustic Session on Original 106 Aberdeen's Sunday Showcase

2008 singles
Ida Maria songs
2008 songs